Olga Bolșova (also written Olga Bolshova; born 16 June 1968 in Chișinău, Moldavian SSR) is a retired Moldovan athlete who specialized in the high jump and triple jump.

Her personal best high jump is 1.97 metres, achieved in September 1993 in Rieti. Her personal best triple jump is 14.24 metres, achieved in June 2003 in Alcalá de Henares. Both results are still Moldovan national records.

Her daughter is tennis professional player Aliona Bolsova.

Achievements

External links

 Profile at Sports-Reference.com

1968 births
Living people
Soviet female high jumpers
Moldovan female high jumpers
Moldovan female triple jumpers
Athletes (track and field) at the 1992 Summer Olympics
Olympic athletes of the Unified Team
Athletes (track and field) at the 1996 Summer Olympics
Athletes (track and field) at the 2000 Summer Olympics
Athletes (track and field) at the 2004 Summer Olympics
Olympic athletes of Moldova
World Athletics Championships athletes for Moldova
Sportspeople from Chișinău
Goodwill Games medalists in athletics
Competitors at the 1994 Goodwill Games